Tangled Destinies is a 1932 pre-Code American murder mystery film directed by Frank R. Strayer. The film is also known as Who Killed Harvey Forbes? in the United Kingdom.

Cast 
Gene Morgan as Capt. Randall "Randy" Gordon
Doris Hill as Doris
Glenn Tryon as Tommy Preston, the Co-pilot
Vera Reynolds as Ruth, the Airline Stewardess
Ethel Wales as Prudence Daggott
Monaei Lindley as Monica van Buren
Syd Saylor as Buchanan, the Prizefighter
Sidney Bracey as McGinnis, posing as Professor Marmont
Lloyd Whitlock as Floyd Martin
James B. Leong as Ling
William P. Burt as Harvey Forbes
Henry Hall as Dr. Wingate, the Parson
William Humphrey as Professor Hartley

References 

1932 films
American mystery films
1932 mystery films
American black-and-white films
Films directed by Frank R. Strayer
Murder mystery films
Mayfair Pictures films
1930s English-language films
1930s American films